Stephen Lee (born 12 October 1974) is an English former professional snooker player who is currently serving a 12-year ban from the sport. He turned professional in 1992, reached a career-high of fifth in the snooker world rankings for the 2000–01 season, and won five ranking titles. His best performances in Triple Crown events were reaching the semi-finals of the 2003 World Championship, where he lost to eventual champion Mark Williams, and reaching the final of the 2008 Masters, where he was runner-up to Mark Selby. He compiled 184 century breaks in professional competition and was noted for his smooth cue action.

West Midlands police arrested Lee in February 2010 as part of an investigation into suspicious betting patterns at the 2009 UK Championship, but no further action was taken against him at that time. Following further reports of irregular betting patterns on a 2012 Premier League match between Lee and John Higgins on 11 October 2012, the World Professional Billiards and Snooker Association (WPBSA) suspended Lee the next day and subsequently brought match-fixing charges against him. After an independent tribunal found Lee guilty of influencing the outcome of seven matches in 2008 and 2009, he was banned from competing in or attending any WPBSA-affiliated tournament for 12 years, backdated to the beginning of his suspension. This is the longest ban ever handed down in the sport. Lee appealed the decision, but his appeal was dismissed in May 2014. His ban will remain in force until 12 October 2024, also the date of his 50th birthday. Lee was ordered to pay the WPBSA £125,000 in costs relating to his hearing and appeal, but has not yet done so.

Career

Early career
Lee turned professional after winning the English Amateur Championship in 1992. During his first season as a professional he had a run of 33 successive frames won during qualifying matches, an all-time professional record. He reached the Top 16 of the rankings five years later, despite never having reached the semi-finals of a ranking event at this point. He entered the Top 8 after winning his first ranking title during the 1998–99 season.

1998–2011
His first ranking victory came at the Grand Prix, in 1998 defeating Dave Harold 6–4 in a hard-fought semi-final that saw Lee come from 3–0 and 4–1 down, before beating newcomer Marco Fu convincingly in the final, 9–2.  His first ranking title and first two ranking semi-finals were all achieved without beating a top-16 player. After a failed drugs test in 2000 briefly upset his momentum, he scored more ranking points than any other player in the 2001–02 season (winning the Scottish Open as well as the Grand Prix), thus briefly making him the provisional world No. 1 early in the following season. Lee was favourite to win the 2001 Masters, but lost 5–6 in the first round to John Parrott. He was part of the England team which won the 2001 Nations Cup. His best run in the World Championship came in the 2003 event when he reached the semi-finals.

Due to a dip in form, at the 2006 Welsh Open he came to the competition outside the provisional Top 16 after failing to win a ranking tournament for four years. He went on to win the tournament, beating the then World Champion, Shaun Murphy, 9–4 in the final.

For 2007–08 he slipped to No. 13 in the rankings after reaching just one semi-final, partly due to missing the China Open for personal reasons. He nevertheless reached the final of the 2008 Masters, losing 3–10 to Mark Selby. Following a heavy defeat by Joe Swail in the first round of the 2008 World Championship, confirming his drop out of the top 16 of the rankings, Lee considered retiring from the game.

However, he did compete in the first ranking event of the 2008–09 season, the 2008 Northern Ireland Trophy, and after convincing wins over Judd Trump and Stephen Hendry, he reached the last 16, where despite making three century breaks he lost 4–5 to eventual runner-up Dave Harold. He then failed to qualify for the Shanghai Masters, losing 4–5 to Tom Ford. He reached the televised stages of the 2009 World Championship by defeating Judd Trump in qualifying, but was beaten 10–4 in the first round by Ryan Day.

On 11 February 2010 Lee was arrested by West Midlands Police on suspicion of cheating, in relation to an investigation by the Gambling Commission over suspicious betting patterns.

During the 2010–11 season Lee managed to regain some form including a win in Event 4 of the EPTC events. However, he drew John Higgins in the first round at both the 2010 UK Championship and World Championship, losing on both occasions with Higgins going on to eventually win both events. At the China Open he drew Mark Williams in the first round and despite Williams making four centuries he won 5–4, making a gutsy 61 clearance to the black in the decider. He went on to reach the quarter-finals, where he lost to Ding Junhui 5–2. Lee won a non-ranking event in 2011 in the CCI Open Invitational he beat Jimmy White 10–7 in the final in Mumbai.

Return to form 

Lee began the 2011–12 season ranked 18 and lost in qualifying for the Australian Goldfields Open and in the first round of the Shanghai Masters. However, he had an excellent run of form in the PTC Events by reaching the quarter-finals of Events 3 and 4 and going one better in Event 6, as he lost to Neil Robertson in the last 4. This meant that Lee returned to the top 16 in October, as he was ranked 13 and therefore gained automatic entry into the upcoming ranking events. He lost in the first round of the 2011 UK Championship and in the German Masters reached his first semi-final since the 2006 Northern Ireland Trophy, but could not get past Ronnie O'Sullivan, who won 6–4. He then made it to the quarter-finals of the Welsh Open, where he was put off by a mobile phone ringing on his back-swing in a deciding frame against Ding Junhui and went on to lose the match. He used his frustration from the incident to good effect however, as he beat Dominic Dale, Neil Robertson, Graeme Dott and Robert Milkins to reach the final of the World Open, his first since the 2006 Welsh Open. He played Mark Allen, but was dominated throughout, as he lost the match 1–10.

Lee enjoyed further success on the PTC calendar as he reached another semi-final, to finish 14th on the Order of Merit and therefore qualified for the last 24 of the Finals. It was in the finals where Lee won his first ranking title for six years as he dropped just three frames during the tournament, including 4–0 whitewashes over Mark Selby and in the final versus Robertson, where Lee became the first player to beat the Australian in a ranking event final. Lee's form in the second half of the season continued into the China Open as he registered his third ranking event semi-final of the year by defeating Judd Trump again, but could not feature in three successive finals as he lost 2–6 to Stephen Maguire. His season did finish in disappointment though as he was beaten in the first round of the World Championship 6–10 by Andrew Higginson. Nevertheless, Lee climbed 10 places in the world rankings to end the season at number 8, the highest he has been since 2003.

Match-fixing and ban
Lee was arrested and bailed on suspicion of match-fixing on 11 February 2010. This followed a police investigation into suspicious betting patterns relating to a match played in 2009, believed to have taken place at the 2009 UK Championship. On 2 October 2012, the WPBSA released a statement confirming that the Crown Prosecution Service would not be taking further action against Lee over the claims. Nine days after the statement was issued, Lee was involved in another controversial match on 11 October which resulted in a 2–4 defeat by John Higgins at a Premier League fixture after Lee had been leading the match 2–1, which caused fellow professional Judd Trump to question the integrity of the result on Twitter, especially since Lee squandered a golden opportunity to level the match at 3 frames all. The following day—on his 38th birthday—Lee was suspended by the WPBSA following reports by at least two bookmakers of irregular betting patterns connected to the Premier League match, pending a full inquiry. Lee appealed against the decision made by the Chairman of the WPBSA; Robert Englehart QC—appointed by Sport Resolutions UK to consider Lee's appeal against suspension—dismissed it, deciding the suspension should remain in place until either the conclusion of the investigation or any resultant hearings.

On 14 February 2013, the WPBSA brought charges against Lee concerning his group matches at the 2008 Malta Cup, two matches at the 2008 UK Championship, his match at the 2009 China Open, and a match at the 2009 World Snooker Championship. He was charged with violating sections 2.8 and 2.9 of the Members Rules and Regulations, which concern divulging information not already in the public domain with the express purpose of it being used for match-betting, and entering into an arrangement to influence the result of a game. Lee applied for permission to play in the 2013 World Championship in the event that the proceedings against him would be brought to a close before the draw was made, but it later transpired that he would be unable to participate in the tournament after learning that his hearing would not take place before the qualifying draw. On 10 April, the WPBSA announced that they would no longer be proceeding with the investigation into the Premier League match, although the inquiry into the remaining match-fixing charges would still go ahead. While suspended from WSA tournaments, Lee continued to compete in independently organised events, winning the RKGKhar Gymkhana Snooker Masters in May.

The case was heard by independent tribunal, Sport Resolutions UK, in a three-day hearing chaired by Adam Lewis QC, starting on 9 September 2013. The verdict was delivered on 16 September, with Lee found guilty of influencing the outcome of seven matches in 2008 and 2009. On 25 September, he received a twelve-year ban from WSA events, backdated to the beginning of his suspension on 12 October 2012, running through to his 50th birthday on 12 October 2024, and ordered to pay £40,000 in costs. It is the longest ban ever imposed in the sport. Lee subsequently appealed against the "finding of the tribunal, the sanction and the costs awarded". Sport Resolutions appointed Edwin Glasgow QC to chair the appeal, with the Appeals Committee determining that the appeal should be heard in two parts. Originally set for 30 January 2014, the appeal was adjourned to 17 February. In the first stage of his appeal Lee challenged the independence of Adam Lewis, chairman of the original tribunal. Lewis had previously represented Leyton Orient F.C.—owned by World Snooker's CEO, Barry Hearn—in a legal dispute, and Lee's legal team argued there was a conflict of interest. The argument was rejected on 25 February, and he was ordered to pay a further £30,000 in costs. The appeals panel recused itself from the second part of the appeal—in which Lee would challenge the guilty verdict itself—after finding him to be an unreliable witness. On 15 May, with Nicholas Stewart QC presiding, the remainder of the appeal was dismissed and the costs awarded against Lee at the Adam Lewis hearing were increased from £40,000 to £75,000. Stewart also awarded further costs of £20,000 against Lee for the second part of his appeal, bringing the total costs awarded against him to £125,000. Lee has never discharged these legal costs. He was removed from the snooker tour and world rankings in June 2014.

Personal life
Lee married his long-term partner Laura in 2005. He has four children, including twin sons. His son Alfie Lee has become a noted amateur snooker player. When playing on the professional tour, he was noted for his unusually high weight.

In September 2015, Lee was featured on the BBC's Inside Out West documentary series, which revealed that he had established the Stephen Lee Billiards Academy, a snooker coaching club for children and young people, in the Chinese city of Shenzhen.

Criminal convictions
Since leaving the professional game, Lee has had several run-ins with the law. On 9 June 2014 Lee pleaded guilty to fraud at Swindon Magistrates' Court and was fined £110. Lee had sold his personal snooker cue to a Facebook fan for £1,600 but when he failed to deliver the cue the fan reported the matter to the police. Lee was also ordered to repay the £1,600 cost of the cue.

On 12 April 2018 Lee was arrested in Hong Kong following an immigration raid at a billiards hall. Lee was charged with teaching snooker without a work permit and appeared in court on 14 April where he pleaded not guilty to breaching the conditions of his tourist visa. Lee was forced to surrender his passport and was bailed until June. Lee changed his plea to a guilty plea on the first day of his trial, and the case was dismissed after he agreed to a 12-month good behaviour bond of HK$1,000 (£95).

Performance and rankings timeline

Career finals

Ranking finals: 9 (5 titles)

Minor-ranking finals: 3 (2 titles)

Non-ranking finals: 4 (2 titles)

Pro-am finals: 7 (4 titles)

Team finals: 1 (1 title)

Amateur finals: 1 (1 title)

See also 
 List of snooker players investigated for match-fixing

References

External links

 
 Player profile on Global Snooker
 Profile on Yahoo! Sport

English snooker players
People from Trowbridge
1974 births
Living people
Place of birth missing (living people)
Match fixers
Banned sportspeople